The Mutant Virus: Crisis in a Computer World is an NES video game produced by ASC Games. It was made in April 1992.

Gameplay

The plot centers around protagonist, Ron, and his fight to eliminate a virus out of a global A.I. that is responsible for every aspect of technology in the game's present day. If Ron is unable to extinguish the virus, humanity will be thrown back to the Stone Age. The player controls a miniature "space ship" that shoots anti-virus and other variations of the weapon to try to contain the virus in that room.

The virus in the game is a cellular automaton following the rules of Conway's Game of Life, with the exception that each cell is either a virus cell (green) or a clean cell (light blue). As new cells are created, they either become virus cells or clean cells depending on which type makes up the majority of their neighbors.

See also
 List of Nintendo Entertainment System games

References

External links

1992 video games
Cellular automata in computer games
Nintendo Entertainment System games
Nintendo Entertainment System-only games
North America-exclusive video games
Science fiction video games
Top-down video games
Video games developed in the United States
ASC Games games
Single-player video games